Johnny Yuma  is an Italian Spaghetti Western directed by Romolo Girolami and starring Mark Damon, Rosalba Neri, and Lawrence Dobkin.

Plot
Conniving wife (Neri) has her husband murdered and finds herself butting heads with his heir and nephew Johnny Yuma (Damon). The woman then enlists the assistance of her ex-lover (Dobkin) who is a professional gunslinger to kill Johnny. When she tries to double-cross the ex-lover, he and the heir team up and kill her bodyguards. The lover is killed but just before he dies, he sabotages her water supply. She flees across the desert but is found the next day having died of thirst.

Cast
 Mark Damon  as Johnny Yuma  
 Lawrence Dobkin  as  Linus Jerome Carradine    
 Rosalba Neri  as   Samantha Felton  
 Luigi Vannucchi (Louis Vanner) as Pedro   
 Fidel Gonzáles  as  Fidel Alvarez Cortese Sanchez Garcia   
 Gustavo D'Arpe (Gus Harper) as   Pitt
 Dada Gallotti  as  Flaminia Jandolo

Soundtrack
The film's score was composed by female Italian composer Nora Orlandi

Release
Johnny Yuma was released in 1966.

References

Footnotes

Sources

External links
 

1966 films
1966 Western (genre) films
Italian Western (genre) films
1960s Italian-language films
Spaghetti Western films
Films directed by Romolo Guerrieri
Films scored by Nora Orlandi
1960s Italian films